The Treaty of Bosque Redondo (also the Navajo Treaty of 1868 or Treaty of Fort Sumner, Navajo  or ) was an agreement between the Navajo and the US Federal Government signed on June 1, 1868. It ended the Navajo Wars and allowed for the return of those held in internment camps at Fort Sumner following the Long Walk of 1864. The treaty effectively established the Navajo as a sovereign nation.

Background
 

Following conflicts between the Navajo and US forces, and scorched earth tactics employed by Kit Carson, which included the burning of tribal crops and livestock, James Henry Carleton issued an order in 1862 that all Navajo would relocate to the Bosque Redondo Reservation near Fort Sumner, in what was then the New Mexico Territory. Those who refused would face "immediate military action". This culminated in the Long Walk of 1864, wherein some 8,000 to 10,000 Navajo and Apache, including women and children, were forced to march over 350 miles from their native land near the Four Corners area.

According to Carleton's planned assimilation, while at Bosque Redondo the Navajo would "become farmers, would live in villages, and would be instructed in Christianity and other American practices".  However, the site up, and personally chosen by Carleton, proved difficult and expensive to maintain, and the conditions for those interned there deplorable. Farming was impractical in the poor quality soil, with inadequate irrigation, and the unpredictable and occasionally destructive waters of the Pecos River. What crops grew were destroyed by worms and floods. Many died of disease and starvation. According to one estimate, from March to December 1865, the total population dropped from approximately 9,000 to some 6,000.

Meanwhile, Bosque Redondo was incurring great expense to the government to maintain. In 1865 the cost of feeding and guarding the Navajo reached some $1,250,000. General William T. Sherman wrote to General James Carleton that the government "cannot and will not maintain" this "extravagant system of expendature," and joked to General John A. Rawlins, that they would be better off sending the Navajo to the "Fifth Avenue Hotel to board at the cost of the United States." By Sherman's own calculation, Bosque Redondo would cost the government some $2,002,277 between 1865 and 1868.

Issues of the camp and the fate of those interred there was debated in Congress, and the Doolittle Committee was formed, led by Chairman of the Committee on Indian Affairs James Rood Doolittle, in order to in part investigate the squalid conditions and provide recommendations to Congress. Eventually in 1867, Carleton was removed from command. The newly formed Indian Peace Commission, established to resolve the pressing issues of the western tribes, made their official report in January of the following year and recommended their course of action concerning the Navajo, that "a treaty be made with them, or their consent in some way [be] obtained, to remove at an early day to the southern district selected by us, where they may soon be made self- supporting."

After negotiating the Second Treaty of Fort Laramie, peace commissioners William Tecumseh Sherman along with Samuel F. Tappan departed  to treat with the Navajo and bring an end to their current arrangement. There they met with Barboncito as tribal representative along with 10 headsmen.

Negotiations

Sherman and Tappan arrived at Fort Sumner on May 28, 1868 with full authority granted by Congress earlier that year to negotiate a treaty. The conditions on the reservation "deeply impressed Sherman" and "appalled Tappan". Tappan likened the plight of the Navajo to that of prisoners of war during the Civil War, imprisoned at Andersonville, Georgia, where conditions deteriorated so dramatically nearly 13,000 had died there. In Sherman's words, "The Navajos had sunk into a condition of absolute poverty and despair."

Initially, Sherman proposed moving the Navajo to the Indian Territory, in what would become the US state of Oklahoma. He offered to send a delegation there at the government's expense. Barboncito refused, and the Navajo resolved that they would not plant again at Bosque Redondo. Barboncito recited his grievances, according to one source:

the crowding together and dying of his people and their stock, their toil in vain, the cursed ground and the shame of going to the commissary for food, the grubbing of mesquite roots for fuel and carrying them on one's back for miles and miles, the Comanches' murderous raids."

The Indian Bureau agent impressed upon the commissioners, that the Navajo were resolute that they should not remain at Bosque Redondo, and although they had remained peaceable thus far, "if not permitted to return to their own country, would leave anyway, committing depredations as they went." Sherman telegraphed to Senator John B. Henderson, who had assumed the chair of the Indian Affairs Committee, advising him that "the Navajos were unalterably opposed to any resettlement in Texas, or any place further east, and would not remain at the Bosque Redondo without the use of overwhelming military force."

Tappan had been in favor of a return to their homeland from the outset, and Sherman relented, convinced that the land was unfit for white settlement, and that he had failed in his efforts to divert the Navajo elsewhere. What was left was to define the area to which they would return, and negotiations (through the double language barrier of translation from English to Spanish, and then from Spanish to Navajo) were not well understood. He agreed they could go outside the reservation to hunt and trade, but must make their homes and farms within its bounds, the area of which he overestimated by nearly double. A dozen miles south of the proposed reservation lay the surveyed route for planned rail construction along the 35th parallel, land which had been promised to the railroad for forty miles on either side.

Signing
Ultimately, regardless of what may have been put down on the "white man's document", the Navajo thought "only of going home". In total, 29 would make their mark, and the treaty was signed on June 1, 1868. It was ratified by the senate on June 24, 1868, and signed by President Andrew Johnson on August 12.

Provisions

The treaty was divided into 13 articles. Much of the substance was modeled after the Treaty of Fort Laramie crafted for the Sioux earlier that year, and similar to many other such treaties, Bosque Redondo included a number of so-called civilization or assimilation provisions, designed to incentivize a transition to a landed agricultural existence. Provisions of the treaty included the following:

 The Navajo would stop all raiding, remain on the reservation in Arizona and New Mexico, and relinquish claims to land outside the reservation.
 The government would supply the Navajo with equipment for farming and seeds for planting. Each family would be allotted  of land. In all, the government agreed to provide 15,000 sheep and goats, and 500 head of cattle. 
 The government agreed to pay $10 annually for 10 years to families engaged in "farming or mechanical pursuits" to be used by the commissioner Indian Affairs to purchase necessities. Those who did not farm would receive $5 payments.
 For ten years the government would provide supplies for the reservation. These were to be provided in the value of $100 for the first year, and $25 annually for the two years thereafter.
 The Navajo agreed to send their children aged six to 13 to attend school for a period of ten years, while the government agreed to provide one teacher per 30 students.
 Those among the tribe who committed crimes would be subject to federal, rather than tribal law.
 The Navajo agreed not to interfere with railroad construction, or to harm any wagon trains or cattle.

Aftermath and legacy

The signing of the treaty, as a treaty, and so defined by the US government as "an agreement between two nations", effectively established the sovereignty of the Navajo Nation, although still dependent on the federal government. However, according to historian Jennifer Nez Denetdale, the treaty was also "the point at which the Navajo people lost their freedom and autonomy, and came under American colonial rule." Denetale continues:

In affixing their X-marks to paper, Diné [Navajo] leader both affirmed Diné sovereignty and acknowledged the authority of the United States to limit tribal sovereignty. They did what they had to do in an impossible situation to allow their people to have a future.

In their "Long Walk Home", the Navajo became a rare example in US history of native people successfully returning to their ancestral lands after being forcibly removed. Although in some respect the treated ended Carleton's Bosque Redondo experiment in failure, he had succeeded in ending the Navajo wars, nullifying the independence of the Navajo, and rendering them "wards of the government".

The group arrived too late in the year to their homeland for the planting season, and were "forced to reply on rations, wild foods" and those Navajo who had avoided the long captivity at Bosque Redondo and had maintained their herds. The people would continue to struggle against their poverty for several years.

The land the newly established Navajo reservation was between 10% and 25% the size of their original lands, and did not include much of the best grazing land, much of which had been occupied by white settlers during the Navajo's internment at Bosque Redondo. The boundaries of the reservation remained nebulous, with as many as half living off the reservation by 1869, and even the army officers in the area were themselves unsure where the limits of the Navajo land may have been. This proved advantageous for both parties. First for the Navajo, who enjoyed the greater freedom of movement allowed by lax enforcement, and also for the government, who could then claim the Navajo failed to respect their agreement, and abrogate their own obligations, saving tens of millions of dollars in subsidies.

Of the benefits the government agreed to provide to the Navajo, none ever fully materialized.

Commemoration
June 1, 1868 is remembered among the Navajo as Treaty Day, and has since been commemorated, including on June 1, 1999, when thousands gathered at a ceremony held at Northern Arizona University. In May 2018, one of two surviving original copies of the treaty was moved to the Navajo Nation Museum, for display as part of the 150th anniversary of the signing. Ceremonies commemorating the 150th anniversary were also held at the Bosque Redondo Memorial, established in 2005, which includes a museum where the second surviving copy was displayed.

See also

 Indian Appropriations Act – Legislation passed by the US government related to tribal lands
 List of United States treaties – Articles on treaties to which the US was a party
 Medicine Lodge Treaty – Negotiated by the Peace Commission with southern Plains Indian tribes in 1867

Notes

References

External links

 
 Proclamation from the Navajo Nation honoring the 150th anniversary of the treaty

United States and Native American treaties
1868 treaties
1868 in the United States
June 1868 events
Native American history of Arizona
Native American history of New Mexico
Navajo history